The Gram–Charlier A series (named in honor of Jørgen Pedersen Gram and Carl Charlier), and the Edgeworth series (named in honor of Francis Ysidro Edgeworth) are series that approximate a probability distribution in terms of its cumulants. The series are the same; but, the arrangement of terms (and thus the accuracy of truncating the series) differ. The key idea of these expansions is to write the characteristic function of the distribution whose probability density function   is to be approximated in terms of the characteristic function of a distribution with known and suitable properties, and to recover  through the inverse Fourier transform.

Gram–Charlier A series
We examine a continuous random variable. We expand in terms of a known distribution with probability density function , characteristic function , and cumulants . The density  is generally chosen to be that of the normal distribution, but other choices are possible as well. By the definition of the cumulants, we have (see Wallace, 1958)
 and 

which gives the following formal identity:

If  is chosen as the normal density 

 

since  for all   > 2, as higher cumulants of the normal distribution are 0. By expanding the exponential and collecting terms according to the order of the derivatives, we arrive at the Gram–Charlier A series. Such an expansion can be written compactly in terms of Bell polynomials as

Since the n-th derivative of the Gaussian function  is given in terms of Hermite polynomial as

this gives us the final expression of the Gram–Charlier A series as

Integrating the series gives us the cumulative distribution function 

where  is the CDF of the normal distribution. 

If we include only the first two correction terms to the normal distribution, we obtain

Note that this expression is not guaranteed to be positive, and is therefore not a valid probability distribution. When it does not converge, the series is also not a true asymptotic expansion, because it is not possible to estimate the error of the expansion. For this reason, the Edgeworth series (see next section) is generally preferred over the Gram–Charlier A series.

The Edgeworth series
Edgeworth developed a similar expansion as an improvement to the central limit theorem. The advantage of the Edgeworth series is that the error is controlled, so that it is a true asymptotic expansion.

Let  be a sequence of independent and identically distributed random variables with finite mean  and variance , and let  be their standardized sums:

Let  denote the cumulative distribution functions of the variables . Then by the central limit theorem,
 

for every , as long as the mean and variance are finite.

then the cumulant differences in the expansion are

The coefficients of n-m/2 term can be obtained by collecting the monomials of the Bell polynomials corresponding to the integer partitions of m. Thus, we have the characteristic function as

where  is a polynomial of degree . Again, after inverse Fourier transform, the density function  follows as

Likewise, integrating the series, we obtain the distribution function 

We can explicitly write the polynomial  as 

For example, if m = 3, then there are three ways to partition this number: 1 + 1 + 1 = 2 + 1 = 3. As such we need to examine three cases:

 1 + 1 + 1 = 1 · k1, so we have k1 = 3,  l1 = 3, and s = 9. 
 1 + 2 = 1 · k1 + 2 · k2, so we have k1 = 1, k2 = 1,  l1 = 3, l2 = 4, and s = 7. 
 3 = 3 · k3, so we have k3 = 1,  l3 = 5, and s = 5. 

Thus, the required polynomial is

The first five terms of the expansion are

Blinnikov and Moessner (1998) have given a simple algorithm to calculate higher-order terms of the expansion.

Note that in case of a lattice distributions (which have discrete values), the Edgeworth expansion must be adjusted to account for the discontinuous jumps between lattice points.

Illustration: density of the sample mean of three χ² distributions

Take   and the sample mean .

We can use several distributions for :
 The exact distribution, which follows a gamma distribution: .
 The asymptotic normal distribution: .
 Two Edgeworth expansions, of degrees 2 and 3.

Discussion of results

 For finite samples, an Edgeworth expansion is not guaranteed to be a proper probability distribution as the CDF values at some points may go beyond .
 They guarantee (asymptotically) absolute errors, but relative errors can be easily assessed by comparing the leading Edgeworth term in the remainder with the overall leading term.

See also

 Cornish–Fisher expansion
 Edgeworth binomial tree

References

Further reading
 H. Cramér. (1957). Mathematical Methods of Statistics. Princeton University Press, Princeton.
 
 M. Kendall & A. Stuart. (1977), The advanced theory of statistics, Vol 1: Distribution theory, 4th Edition, Macmillan, New York.
 P. McCullagh (1987). Tensor Methods in Statistics.  Chapman and Hall, London.
 D. R. Cox and O. E. Barndorff-Nielsen (1989). Asymptotic Techniques for Use in Statistics.  Chapman and Hall, London.
 P. Hall (1992). The Bootstrap and Edgeworth Expansion. Springer, New York.
 
 
 
 J. E. Kolassa (2006). Series Approximation Methods in Statistics (3rd ed.). (Lecture Notes in Statistics #88). Springer, New York.

Mathematical series
Statistical approximations